Laurent Fabre (1968 - August 22, 2012) was a French ski mountaineer, high mountain guide and non-commissioned officer of the Chasseurs Alpins corps. He served at the 93rd Mountain Artillery Regiment and was married to the ski mountaineer Valentine Fabre. He was killed in a training accident on the Mont Blanc massif while serving as an instructor at the High Mountain Military School.

Selected results 
 2000:
 6th, Patrouille des Glaciers (international military teams ranking), together with Sgt chef Tony Sbalbi and Adj Patrick Rassat
 2001:
 6th, European Championship team race (together with Tony Sbalbi)
 2002:
 1st, Corssa race (together with Olivier Pasteur)
 2nd, Trophée des Gastlosen (together with Olivier Pasteur)

Pierra Menta 

 1999: 9th, together with Tony Sbalbi
 2002: 9th, together with Olivier Pasteur
 2003: 8th, together with Gabriel Degabai

External links 
 Laurent Fabre at skimountaineering.org

References 

1968 births
Living people
French male ski mountaineers
French military patrol (sport) runners